This is a list of members of the Victorian Legislative Assembly from 10 November 1920 to 6 August 1921, as elected at the 1920 state election:

 On 13 December 1920, the Elections and Qualifications Committee of the Legislative Assembly declared the election of Edwin Mackrell to the seat of Upper Goulburn was void, as Mackrell had failed to properly nominate his candidacy in the specified time, and had committed other technical breaches. A by-election was held on 27 January 1921, at which Mackrell was nominated and retained the seat.

Sources
 Re-member (a database of all Victorian MPs since 1851). Parliament of Victoria.

Members of the Parliament of Victoria by term
20th-century Australian politicians